Petar Šegvić (25 June 1930 – 7 June 1990) was a Croatian rower who won a gold medal in the coxless four event at the 1952 Summer Olympics.

References

1930 births
1990 deaths
Rowers from Split, Croatia
Yugoslav male rowers
Croatian male rowers
Olympic rowers of Yugoslavia
Rowers at the 1952 Summer Olympics
Olympic gold medalists for Yugoslavia
Olympic medalists in rowing
Medalists at the 1952 Summer Olympics
Burials at Lovrinac Cemetery